itslearning is a digital learning management system developed by the Norwegian company itslearning AS. It is designed for both K12 and higher education. The LMS allows teachers to deliver materials to students, including assessments, Office 365 documents, etc.

History
The system was created by a group of students at Bergen University College in 1998 as a project on the topic of "virtual classrooms". A group of teachers asked whether the system could be created, and after receiving a sum of start-up money from the College, itslearning was created the following year and Bergen University College became the first user of the system. The company was first established as "it:solutions".

In 2004, Arne Bergby became CEO of itslearning. A U.S. office was opened in 2009 in Massachusetts. In 2013, itslearning acquired SkoleIntra, and in 2015 Fronter. In 2014, 40% of the company was sold to the Swedish private equity fund EQT. The company at the time was valued at 600 million NOK ($73 million).

In December 2019, itslearning was acquired by Sanoma Group – a leading European learning and media company headquartered in Helsinki, Finland.

As of 2020, the company headquarters are in Bergen, Norway, with offices in Oslo, Berlin, Boston, Copenhagen, Enschede, Helsinki, Milton Keynes, Malmö, and Paris.

Features
Itslearning demonstrates features that enable 21st century learning models. Some of these include:
 A content library
 Advanced reporting and analytics
 Individual learning plan capabilities
 Teacher communities
 Follow-Up and reports for students
 Teacher-to-student messaging
The system gives teachers and students a virtual home for learning collaboration. There are tools for individual and group messaging, group projects, classroom competitions.

Content
The system is an arena for communication and cooperation, as well as a tool for administration, evaluation and follow-up. itslearning is specially adapted for schools, and enables publishing of subject schedules, and individual or group messages (as to a class). In project assignments, students can create groups where files may be uploaded, or ideas discussed. It is also possible to create and publish tests and competitions in the system. Assignments may be published with or without a deadline, and hand-ins may be uploaded digitally, with options for grading the hand-in digitally and displaying the assessment to the student. There is also access to ePortfolio, which gives students a concrete end-of-year presentation of their accomplishments.

Users
itslearning has millions of active users worldwide, mainly in the United States, Norway, Sweden, Denmark, the Netherlands, the United Kingdom, France and Germany.
Over 900.000 users exist in Norway alone.

In Norway, itslearning is used extensively by several states and educational institutions, including BI Norwegian Business School. Additionally, it is used by primary, middle and high schools. The county municipalities of Oslo, Vestland, Hedmark, Nordland, Rogaland, Vest-Agder and Vestfold all use itslearning in high schools.

In May 2020, itslearning became the leading learning management system in higher education in Denmark after the University of Southern Denmark (SDU) selected itslearning as their new learning management system for 45,000 users following a rigorous tender process that involved several large and well-established LMS providers. itslearning also supports teaching and learning at University College Copenhagen, VIA University College, University College Lillebælt, University College Southern Denmark, University College Absalon and several other higher educational institutions in Denmark.

Several US school districts use itslearning as a school platform, including Houston Independent School District, Savannah-Chatham County Public School System, Spring Branch Independent School District, Forsyth County Schools, and Bartholomew Consolidated School Corporation.

Reception
Evaluations of itslearning indicate that its users were satisfied with the system. A survey carried out in 2003 showed that a high percentage of users at Bergen University College were pleased with the system. In 2010, A second survey, carried out in conjunction with a Master's degree project, showed that 67% of students at different faculties at Norwegian University of Science and Technology and Sør-Trøndelag University College are satisfied or very satisfied with itslearning. However, another survey also carried out at Norwegian University of Science and Technology in 2013 showed a multitude of issues both students and teachers were dissatisfied with.

Awards

 Winner of 2019 EdTech Digest Cool Tool Award for Learning Management System (LMS) Solution (2019) 
 Finalists for Bartholomew Consolidated School Corporation (IN) “Deeper Learning for All Students” (Universal Design for Learning) (2019)
 IMS Global, Using LMS Interoperability to Power and Drive Student-Centered Learning. Metropolitan School District of Wayne Township (2018) 
 IMS Global, Bronze Medal: Taking Technology Integration to the Next Level in K-12. Houston ISD (2017)
 IMS Global, Silver Medal: itslearning “HUB” at Houston ISD (2015)
 CODiE award for best personalized learning platform (2014)
 TISIP's e-learning award (2009)
 DnB NOR's business award (2008)
 Bergen municipality establisher award
 Rising star Award (2007)

References

https://www.youtube.com/channel/UCTql2Ej61edWLjphCf6nbzw

External links 
 https://itslearning.com

Norwegian educational websites
1999 establishments in Norway
Computer-related introductions in 1999
Educational software
Learning management systems
Educational technology companies of Norway